Xiao Hua (萧华 or 肖华; January 21, 1916 – August 12, 1985), also known as Xiao Yizun,  was a general of the Chinese People's Liberation Army. He was a Hakka from Xingguo County,  Jiangxi Province.

1916 births
1985 deaths
People's Liberation Army generals from Jiangxi
People from Xingguo County
Vice Chairpersons of the National Committee of the Chinese People's Political Consultative Conference
Burials at Babaoshan Revolutionary Cemetery